"Jesus Muzik" is the second single from Lecrae's second studio album, After the Music Stops.  It is critically acclaimed and was nominated for two GMA Dove Awards. The song also features fellow Christian hip hop artist Trip Lee. The lyrics discuss the problems with the content of secular hip hop, and the importance for Christians of listening to Christian music to glorify God.

Awards 

In 2007, the song was nominated for a Dove Award for Rap/Hip-Hop Recorded Song of the Year at the 38th GMA Dove Awards.

References

Cross Movement Records
2006 singles
Lecrae songs
Reach Records singles
2006 songs
Songs about Jesus